Bellotti is an Italian surname. Notable people with the surname include:

 Biagio Bellotti (1714-1789), Italian painter, architect, sculptor, musician and canon
 David Bellotti (1943–2015), British politician
 Derek Bellotti (born 1946), English footballer
 Francesco Bellotti (born 1979), Italian cyclist
 Francis X. Bellotti (born 1923), American lawyer, politician in Massachusetts
 Laurie Bellotti (born 1976), former Australian rules footballer
 Luigi Bellotti (1914–1995), Vatican diplomat
 Michael G. Bellotti (born 1963), American politician in Massachusetts
 Mike Bellotti (born 1950), American football analyst
 Piero Bellotti (born 1942), Italian wrestler
 Pietro Bellotti (1625–1700), Italian painter
 Reece Bellotti (born 1990), British boxer
 Riccardo Bellotti (born 1991), Italian tennis player
 Victoria Bellotti, User Experience Manager for Growth at Lyft, Inc.

See also
 Belotti
 Bellotti v. Baird (1976)
 Bellotti v. Baird (1979)
 First National Bank of Boston v. Bellotti
 Bellotti's goby, species of goby native to the Mediterranean Sea 
 Italian Bellotti Cymbals, small Italian cymbal workshop, active from the 50s until the 70s

Italian-language surnames